The Church of St Martin is a 19th-century church in Marple, Greater Manchester, England.

It was designed by J. D. Sedding for Maria Anne Hudson (1819–1906), who lived in nearby Brabyns Hall, and was built between 1869 and 1870. The north chapel and aisle were added later by Henry Wilson, in 1895–96 and 1909 respectively. The stained glass in the windows in the chancel are by the Morris company with designs by Edward Burne-Jones, Dante Gabriel Rossetti, Ford Madox Brown and William Morris. The organ from 1870 is by Henry Willis.

On 11 October 1985, it was designated a Grade II* listed building. To the rear is a former schoolroom and schoolmaster's house, now a parish hall and private house, designed by Sedding's brother Edmund Sedding and separately listed at Grade II.

See also

 List of churches in Greater Manchester
 Grade II* listed buildings in Greater Manchester
 Listed buildings in Marple, Greater Manchester

References

Churches completed in 1870
19th-century Church of England church buildings
Marple, St Martin
Marple
Marple
Marple, Greater Manchester